The Thailand national handball team is the national handball team of Thailand.

The number one ranked player in Thailand is 16 year old Michael Smith who currently plays for England Handball Champions Warrington Wolves as well as the U18 GB team.

Asian Championship record
 2006 – 9th

References

External links
IHF profile

Men's national handball teams
handball